Korea Polytechnics (Korean: 한국폴리텍대학) mean two or three-years public vocational school in South Korea. It has 11 colleges in 34 cities.

List of schools
Korea Polytechnic I
 Seoul Jungsu Campus - Yongsan, Seoul
 Seongnam Campus - Seongnam, Gyeonggi
 Seoul Gangseo Campus - Gangseo, Seoul
 Jeju Campus - Jeju City, Jeju
Korea Polytechnic II
 Anseong Campus - Gongdo, Anseong
 Incheon Campus - Bupyeong, Incheon
 Namincheon Campus - Nam-gu, Incheon
 Hwaseong Campus - Hwaseong, Gyeonggi
Korea Polytechnic III
 Chuncheon Campus - Chuncheon, Gangwon
 GangneungCampus - Gangneung, Gangwon
 Wonju Campus - Wonju, Gangwon
 Jeongseon Campus - Jeongseon, Gangwon
Korea Polytechnic IV
 Daejeon Campus - Dong-gu, Daejeon
 Cheongju Campus - Cheongju, North Chungcheong
 Asan Campus - Asan, South Chungcheong
 Hongseong Campus - Hongseong, South Chungcheong
 Jecheon Campus - Jecheon, North Chungcheong
 Chungju Campus - Chungju, North Chungcheong
Korea Polytechnic V
 Gwangju Campus - Buk-gu, Gwangju
 Gimje Campus - Gimje, North Jeolla
 Mokpo Campus - Mokpo, South Jeolla
 Gochang Campus - Gochang, North Jeolla
 Iksan Campus - Iksan, North Jeolla
 Suncheon Campus - Suncheon, South Jeolla
 Namwon Campus - Namwon, North Jeolla
Korea Polytechnic VI – Daegu, Gumi, Pohang and Yeongju
 Daegu Campus - Seo-gu, Daegu
 Gumi Campus - Gumi, North Gyeongsang
 Dalseong Campus - Dalseong, Daegu
 Pohang Campus - Pohang, North Gyeongsang
 Yeongju Campus - Yeongju, North Gyeongsang
 Gimcheon Campus - Gimcheon, North Gyeongsang
Korea Polytechnic VII
 Changwon Campus - Changwon, South Gyeongsang
 Busan Campus - Buk-gu, Busan
 Ulsan Campus - Jung-gu, Ulsan
 Geochang Campus - Geochang, South Gyeongsang
 Dongbusan Campus - Gijang, Busan
 Jinju Campus - Jinju, South Gyeongsang
Korea Aviation Polytechnic – Sacheon, South Gyeongsang
Korea Bio Polytechnic – Nonsan, South Chungcheong
Korea Textile and Fashion Polytechnic – Dalseo-gu, Daegu

External links
Korea Polytechnics Introduction

 
Universities and colleges in South Korea
Educational institutions established in 2006
2006 establishments in South Korea